Licharegi-ye Hasan Rud Rural District is a rural district (dehestan) in the Central District of Bandar-e Anzali County, Gilan Province, Iran. At the 2006 census, its population was 7,335, in 2,149 families. The rural district has 7 villages.

References 

Rural Districts of Gilan Province
Bandar-e Anzali County